The Play-offs of the 2005 Fed Cup Europe/Africa Zone Group II were the final stages of the Group I Zonal Competition involving teams from Europe and Africa. Using the positions determined in their pools, the sixteen teams faced off to determine their placing in the 2005 Fed Cup Europe/Africa Zone Group III. The top two teams advanced to 2006 Fed Cup Europe/Africa Zone Group II.

Promotion play-offs
The first placed teams of each pool were placed against each other in two head-to-head rounds. The winner of the rounds advanced to Group II for next year.

Turkey vs. Algeria

Bosnia and Herzegovina vs. Portugal

Fifth to Seventh play-off
The second placed teams of each pool were placed against each other in two ties. The winner of each tie was allocated fifth place in the Group while the losers were allocated seventh.

Egypt vs. Botswana

Namibia vs. Moldova

Ninth and Eleventh play-off
The third placed teams of each pool were placed against each other in two ties. The winner of each tie was allocated ninth place in the Group while the losers were allocated eleventh.

Malta vs. Iceland

Cyprus vs. Kenya

Final Placements

  and  advanced to the Europe/Africa Zone Group II for the next year. The Portuguese placed third overall, while the Algerians did not compete next year.

See also
Fed Cup structure

References

External links
 Fed Cup website

2005 Fed Cup Europe/Africa Zone